The vast majority of rapid transit systems use . Some of the largest and oldest subway systems in the world use standard gauge in agreement with the country wide dominant usage for track gauge, e.g. London Underground (1863), Chicago "L" (1892), Vienna Metro (1898), Paris Métro (1900), Berlin U-Bahn (1902), New York City Subway (1904), Stockholm Metro (1950), Milan Metro (1964), Mexico City Metro (1969), Beijing Subway (1971), Seoul Metropolitan Subway (1974), Shanghai Metro (1993), Guangzhou Metro (1997), Shenzhen Metro (2004). Many rapid transit systems in countries where the main lines do not use standard gauges are built in standard gauge, including the Barcelona Metro, Santiago Metro, Taipei Metro, and many systems in India.

There are also systems that use  (some systems in Japan and Jakarta MRT),  (the standard in former Soviet Union),  (the standard in Brazil) and few others.

Some systems use rubber tires, with some ones adding them to the normal steel wheels (e.g. Paris Metro, Mexico City Metro, Montreal Metro) and some others with only tires (e.g. Lille Metro, Sapporo Municipal Subway).

Some systems use monorail, the largest ones are in Chongqing Rail Transit and in São Paulo Metro.

For references for the figures, see each system's page and List of metro systems.



See also 

 List of metro systems
 List of track gauges
 List of tram systems by gauge and electrification
 Track gauge

References 

Rapid transit
Track gauges
Rapid transit track gauges